Barry Langford (7 February 1926 – 25 July 2012) was a television and music director, producer, and businessman. He directed many television programmes for the BBC in the 1960s and 1970s, and also worked as manager for musical artists including David Bowie and Tom Jones. He was one of the pioneers of cut editing and rapid perspective changes in BBC television programming, and was a major force behind the creation of Israeli television in the 1970s.

Professional career

Early career
Upon reaching 18 years old during the closing years of World War II, Barry Langford was called for service in the British Army. His family had a long history as professional entertainers (including musicians, whistlers, and stuntmen) and this saw his talents being channeled into the Entertainment National Service Association ENSA Entertainments National Service Association, providing entertainment to the British Army during his period of service.

Barry's father, Louis Langford (originally surname was Lelyveld, his family being natives of the Netherlands) had run the family silver business during the war years. After the war, Louis retired, putting the collection in the London Silver Vaults Barry took over the family silver business after his father's retirement. He entered a small, niche industry, with only 3–4 dealers present at the vaults at the time, mostly trading with other dealers. Barry opted to take the silver business in a new direction. His enormous flair for publicity and concerted efforts to market the Chancellery Lane silver vaults to Americans paid off, with the business becoming highly successful as it became more retail-oriented. Success saw the business moving to Charles Street, the new shop proving a good business headquarters for the Langford silver business. Celebrities such as Elizabeth Taylor, Liberace, and Ava Gardner were drawn to and became customers of the Langford silver business.

Over time, Barry's talents for publicity and entertainment saw him beginning to produce shows at Brighton Theatre. He also was featured as one of five citizens of London in the documentary Citizen 63  directed by John Boorman. His activities eventually caught the attention of entertainment mogul Lew Grade. The two eventually met, with Barry and Lew sharing similar tastes in entertainment style and direction. Lew guided Barry and set him on his course as a TV director, recognizing in Barry a natural talent for publicity and style.

British television and music industry
With the guidance of Lew Grade and his innate stylistic talents, Barry became a highly successful and innovative television programme director despite having no previous professional experience. He directed "The Beat Room", a highly popular British pop programme as well as other successful British pop shows, including the Juke Box Jury, "Dad, you're a square", "Exit, It's The Way Out", "Gadzooks, It's All Happening", and the Tom Jones BBC TV series. While producing in the music industry, he discovered David Bowie and helped launch Tom Jones' career, managing them both for a time. He also managed the American singer P.J. Proby.
Barry Langford was involved in the discovery of the Who, featuring them on the Beat Room and other programmes he produced or directed. Later in his career, he acted in or did screenwriting for various Israeli-made films.

Personal life
Langford was born 7 February 1926 in London, England. He was the older brother of Lawrence Langford (1927–2020), who created one of the world's largest collections of marine antiques and model ships. He was a first-class bridge player, having played professional for Australian teams as well as becoming one of Israel's top players. He died on 25 July 2012 in Israel.

Childhood
Growing up in the UK, Langford lived a happy childhood with his younger brother Lawrence. Barry had shown an interest and knowledge of music even at an early age. His passion for music would one day guide him towards becoming involved in the music industry.

The Langford family moved repeatedly during Barry's childhood, his father Louis moving the family as he travelled from business to business. Louis avoided telling other people the Langford family was Jewish, in light of antisemitic stereotypes of the time. Barry's education suffered as a result of switching school several times, his grades being poorly affected by this. This caused classmates to underestimate his keen intelligence, which manifested itself well in social situations. Largely self-educated, Barry adapted to the many changes in his early life quickly, a valuable skill that would service him well in later life.

Adult life
Before his directing and producing career began, while still working in the Langford family silver business, Langford met Shirley Hale, the daughter of another silver dealer. The two, having many similarities, soon married. After leaving the silver business, the family travelled together, moving back and forth twice between Australia and the United Kingdom in 1965, 1967, and 1969, before finally moving and settling in Israel in 1972.

At the age of 45, Langford and his family settled in Israel. Becoming involved in the Israeli television and music industry, he lived and worked in Israel until retiring. Later in life, he and Shirley Hale divorced.

Political activism
After being released from military service after World War II, Barry Langford became one of the early members of the 43 group, along with Vidal Sassoon. The 43 Group was originally composed of 43 young British Jewish ex-servicemen who opposed the political organization and activities of Oswald Mosley & the Union Movement, Jeffrey Hamm's British League of Ex-Servicemen, and other British fascist organizations. Activities ranged from protests, breaking up far-right meetings, infiltrating different fascist parties and groups, to street fighting.

See also
Entertainments National Service Association

References

1926 births
2012 deaths
British Jews
British television directors